Peter Ridgway is an Australian prosecutor and a former Deputy Director of Prosecutions in Fiji.

As Deputy Director of Prosecutions Ridgeway was responsible for investigating alleged links between members of the government and the 2000 Fijian coup d'état. He strongly criticized the government's early release of coup convicts, and the Reconciliation, Tolerance, and Unity Bill which he interpreted as a legal mechanism for pardoning individuals convicted of participating in the coup.

Ridgeway's contract expired in May 2005 and was not renewed. He returned to Australia, and Prime Minister Laisenia Qarase subsequently refused to recall him. Ridgeway subsequently accused the government of interfering with the course of justice by intervening in a number of coup-related trials.

On 31 December 2006, Commodore Frank Bainimarama, who had deposed Qarase in a military coup on 5 December, invited Ridgway to return to Fiji to restart his investigations into the 2000 coup. In February 2007 he returned to Fiji to work for the military regime.

References

Year of birth missing (living people)
Living people
Australian expatriates in Fiji
People deported from Fiji
20th-century Australian lawyers
Fijian civil servants
21st-century Fijian lawyers